Vizcaíno may refer to:

Biscayne (ethnonym), an ethnonym in use in Spanish between the Renaissance and 19th century, meaning a Basque speaking person

Places
Key Biscayne, originally Cayo Vizcaíno, an island in Florida, USA
Sebastián Vizcaíno Bay, a natural feature of Baja California Peninsula, Mexico
Vizcaíno, Baja California Sur, including Vizcaino Desert and the island of Vizcaino
El Vizcaíno Biosphere Reserve, including the El Vizcaíno Whale Sanctuary and part of the El Vizcaíno Desert, Baja California Peninsula, Mexico
Vizcaíno Island, an island in the estuary between the River Uruguay and River Negro in Uruguay
Vizcaínos, a village with 50 inhabitants in Burgos Provinicia, Spain

People
Arnoldo Vizcaíno, Mexican PDR politician
Arodys Vizcaíno (born 1990), Dominican Republic baseball player
Antonio Camacho Vizcaíno (born 1964), Spanish Minister of the Interior
Fernando Vizcaíno Casas (1926–2003), Spanish labour lawyer and writer
Juan Vizcaíno (born 1966), Spanish footballer
José Vizcaíno (born 1968), Dominican Republic baseball player
Luis Vizcaíno (born 1974), Dominican Republic baseball player
Pablo Vizcaíno Prado (born 1951), Guatemalan bishop
Pedro Vizcaíno (born 1966), Cuban-born American painter
Nectalí Vizcaíno (born 1977), Colombian footballer
José Madero Vizcaíno (born 1980), lead singer of the Mexican group Panda
Roberto Vizcaíno (1957–2016), Spanish tennis player
Sebastián Vizcaíno (1548–1624), Spanish explorer
Indira Vizcaíno Silva (born 1987), Mexican PDR congresswoman, daughter of Arnoldo Vizcaíno

See also
Vizcaino vs. Microsoft, judicial case (USA) on the rights of permatemp workers
Biscayne (disambiguation)
Biscaino (disambiguation)

Basque-language surnames